Jazwyn Michael Cowan (born November 11, 1983) is an American professional basketball player who currently plays for San Lorenzo de Almagro of the Torneo Nacional de Ascenso (TNA) in Argentina. Born in Baltimore, Maryland, he played college basketball at both George Washington University and Hampton University. He is a  forward.

In April 2006, he signed with the Nebraska Cranes. Later that year, he joined the Chester Jets for the 2006–07 season. He has since played in Brazil, Argentina, Dominican Republic, and Mexico.

On October 31, 2013, Cowan was acquired by the Austin Toros of the NBA Development League.

In September 2014, Cowan signed with San Lorenzo de Almagro of Argentina for the 2014–15 season.

In 2015, Signs with Instituto de Cordoba for the LNB

References

External links
Profile at Eurobasket.com

1983 births
Living people
American expatriate basketball people in Argentina
American expatriate basketball people in Mexico
American expatriate basketball people in the United Kingdom
Austin Toros players
Basketball players from Baltimore
British Basketball League players
Cheshire Jets players
George Washington Colonials men's basketball players
Glasgow Rocks players
Hampton Pirates men's basketball players
American men's basketball players
Forwards (basketball)
United States Basketball League players
Quilmes de Mar del Plata basketball players
San Lorenzo de Almagro (basketball) players
Trigueros de Ciudad Obregón players